Otis Carter Formby King (1876–1944) was an electrical engineer in London who invented and produced a cylindrical slide rule with helical scales, primarily for business uses initially.  The product was named Otis King's Patent Calculator, and was manufactured and sold by Carbic Ltd. in London from about 1922 to about 1972.

With a log-scale decade length of 66 inches, the Otis King calculator should be about a full digit more accurate than a 6-inch pocket slide rule.  But due to inaccuracies in tic-mark placement, some portions of its scales will read off by more than they should.  For example, a reading of 4.630 might represent an answer of 4.632, or almost one part in 2000 error, when it should be accurate to one part in 6000 (66"/6000 = 0.011" estimated interpolation accuracy).

The Geniac brand cylindrical slide rule sold by Oliver Garfield Company in New York was initially a relabelled Otis King; Garfield later made his own, probably unauthorized version of the Otis King (around 1959). The UK patents covering the mechanical device(s) would have expired in about 1941–1942 (i.e. 20 years after filing of the patent) but copyright in the drawings would typically only expire 70 years after the author's death.

Patents 
 UK patent GB 207,762 (1922) 
 UK patent GB 183,723 (1921) 
 UK patent GB 207,856 (1922) 
 US patent US 1,645,009 (1923) 
 Canadian patent CA 241986 
 Canadian patent CA 241076 
 French patent FR569985 
 French patent FR576616 
 German patent DE 418814

See also 
 Bygrave slide rule
 Fuller's cylindrical slide rule

External links
 Dick Lyon's Otis King pages
 Cylindrical rules at Museum of HP Calculators

References 

1876 births
1944 deaths
English inventors
Mechanical calculators
Logarithms
English inventions
Analog computers